Major-General Norcliffe Norcliffe  (24 September 1791 – 8 February 1862) was a British Army officer and landowner. Having joined the 4th Dragoons in 1807, he fought with them in the Peninsular War, and survived a serious head wound at the Battle of Salamanca in 1812. After the war he continued in the army, transferring to the 17th Lancers and then the 18th Hussars before going on half-pay as a major. Norcliffe continued to purchase promotions and became a major-general in 1855. He inherited the Langton Hall estate from his mother in 1835 but chose to live more in London. He died there at the age of 70 in 1862.

Life

Military career
Norcliffe Norcliffe was born Norcliffe Dalton on 24 September 1791, the eldest son of Lieutenant-Colonel Thomas Dalton and Anne  Wilson. Norcliffe had six younger siblings, two brothers and four sisters. His two brothers died at an early age. Norcliffe embarked on a career in the British Army on 5 February 1807, aged 16, as a cornet in the 4th Dragoons. In August 1807 Norcliffe's father changed his surname from Dalton to Norcliffe upon inheriting the Langton Hall estate from his maternal uncle. Norcliffe was then promoted to lieutenant on 30 April 1808, and from April 1809 served with his regiment in the Peninsular War.

Norcliffe fought at the Battle of Talavera on 27 July 1809, and then the Battle of Busaco on 27 September 1810, the Battle of Albuera on 16 May 1811, and the Battle of Usagre on 25 May the same year. He was severely wounded in the head at the Battle of Salamanca on 22 July 1812. With the French infantry having been broken, Norcliffe was part of the cavalry charging after them. He became separated from his regiment along with a few members of the 5th Dragoon Guards, and was surrounded by French infantry. As he attempted to fight through this force his horse was shot in the ear and turned around, in which moment Norcliffe was shot in the head. He lost his balance and fell from the horse.

Norcliffe lay on the ground, unable to move, and was found by several French infantrymen who took him prisoner and provided some medical care. The British then continued their advance and pushed the French away from Norcliffe. With his wound possibly mortal, he was brought in for treatment by a surgeon. He was nursed back to health by his cousin Susanna Dalbiac, who was the wife of Norcliffe's commanding officer Colonel James Charles Dalbiac.  While in hospital on 10 August Norcliffe wrote a letter to his father describing the battle, saying: 

Norcliffe continued in the Iberian Peninsula until November. The Napoleonic Wars ended in the following year but Norcliffe stayed in the army and was promoted to captain on 29 February 1816. For his war service he received the Military General Service Medal with four clasps in 1848.

Norcliffe was promoted to major on 20 August 1821, and then transferred to the 17th Lancers on 20 December. Norcliffe transferred again on 22 May 1823, this time to the 18th Hussars. The 18th had in fact been disbanded in 1821, and Norcliffe had transferred to them to go on half pay for what he described as "peculiar private motives". Norcliffe spent the rest of his army career on half pay, continuing to buy his promotions. He was created a Knight of the Royal Guelphic Order by William IV in 1836.p On 10 January the following year he advanced to lieutenant-colonel. Norcliffe then became a colonel on 11 November 1851, before being promoted by seniority to major-general on 31 August 1855. The National Army Museum suggests that Norcliffe stayed in the army despite not actively serving past 1823 because the commissions kept their value and could be used as an investment.

Family and retirement

Norcliffe inherited Langton Hall from his mother in 1835, but did not stay there often, preferring to instead live in London when he was not partaking in extensive travels of North America and Europe. One of Norcliffe's nieces was the artist Mary Ellen Best, the daughter of his third sister Mary. Norcliffe was very close to Best and supported her artistry. She painted a number of scenes of life at Langton Hall and the family there, including some of Norcliffe. In one image Best portrays Norcliffe sitting in his study surrounded by paintings and prints of battles of the Napoleonic Wars, and in another in the dining room having breakfast with his extended family.

Norcliffe married Decima Hester Beatrix Foulis in York on 24 June 1824. The couple had a son, Thomas, in 1825, who died unmarried in 1849. Norcliffe's wife also predeceased him, dying in 1828, and Norcliffe was left without a direct heir. He died in London on 8 February 1862 after an illness of three days, aged 70. He was succeeded by his niece Rosamond Robinson, Best's elder sister, who subsequently changed her surname to Norcliffe by Royal Licence. Norcliffe was buried next to his son in Kensal Green Cemetery.

Notes and citations

Notes

Citations

References

British Army major generals
1791 births
1862 deaths